Die Hard: Nakatomi Plaza is a first-person shooter video game developed by Piranha Games and published by Vivendi Universal Games and its subsidiary Sierra Entertainment exclusively for Microsoft Windows. The game originally used a modified Build engine, later the GoldSrc engine, before it was finally moved to the Lithtech engine. The game features the voice of Reginald VelJohnson, reprising his role as Al Powell.

Premise
The game consists mainly of recreations of events from the first Die Hard film in the form of a first-person shooter; however, there are additional elements that are exclusive to the game. Players assume the role of John McClane, attempting to thwart the terrorist attack at Nakatomi Plaza. The levels are based on the sets from the film, and the various action scenes from the film have also been recreated.

The game expands on the film's plot, adding a few missions that did not occur in the film, such as escorting a SWAT team around the office building and saving various hostages on several floors.

The game features standard first-person shooter gameplay. There are five different types of firearms, as well as other items, such as a Zippo lighter and a Motorola radio, that can be used to accomplish various tasks.

Reception

The game received "mixed" reviews according to the review aggregation website Metacritic.

References

External links
 

2002 video games
Christmas video games
Windows games
Windows-only games
Nakatomi Plaza
First-person shooters
Fox Interactive games
Sierra Entertainment games
Video games developed in Canada
LithTech games
Video games about police officers
Video games scored by Guy Whitmore
Video games set in Los Angeles
Video games about terrorism
Single-player video games